The South Side School is a historic U.S. school in Fort Lauderdale, Florida. It is located at 701 South Andrews Avenue. On July 19, 2006, it was added to the U.S. National Register of Historic Places. South Side School opened in 1922 due Florida land boom of the 1920s. 
The architect of the South Side School was John Peterman and the builder was Cayot and Hart. In 1949 the school was expanded, it was enlarged again in 1954. South Side School was changed from an elementary school in 1967 to be a school for special needs children. In 1990s the school was closed. The school became a city-designated historic landmark in 1996. Although the city hopes to turn the building into a cultural arts center, the renovation has encountered several setbacks.

References

External links

National Register of Historic Places in Broward County, Florida
Education in Fort Lauderdale, Florida